The 1974 Virginia Slims of Detroit  was a women's tennis tournament played on indoor carpet courts at the Cobo Hall & Arena  in Detroit, Michigan in the United States that was part of the 1974 Virginia Slims World Championship Series. It was the third edition of the tournament and was held from February 20 through February 24, 1974. First-seeded Billie Jean King won the singles title and earned $10,000 first-prize money.

Finals

Singles
 Billie Jean King defeated  Rosemary Casals 6–1, 6–1

Doubles
 Rosemary Casals /  Billie Jean King defeated  Françoise Dürr /  Betty Stöve 2–6, 6–4, 7–5

Prize money

References

Virginia Slims of Detroit
Virginia Slims of Detroit
1974 in sports in Michigan
February 1974 sports events in the United States